Tone Glenn Küsel-Gabriel (born 29 April 1996) is a Ghanaian professional footballer who plays as a forward for Scottish League One club Peterhead.

Club career
Born in Hamburg, Gabriel represented Brentford, Stoke City and FC St. Pauli as a youth.

On 11 July 2014, he signed a three-year deal with Cypriot First Division side Ermis Aradippou FC, but left the club at the end of the season without making a single appearance.

On 13 August 2017, Gabriel signed a six-month contract with Rovaniemen Palloseura. He made his professional debut the following day, coming on as a late substitute for Timo Stavitski in a 1–0 Veikkausliiga away win against Helsingin Jalkapalloklubi, but only featured in three further matches before being released.

On 24 August 2018, after another six months of inactivity, Gabriel joined Lorca FC in Tercera División.

In March 2020, Gabriel joined English non-league side Hendon from Mousehole but left without making an appearance. In December 2021, he joined Thatcham Town, scoring once in five league appearances.

Gabriel joined Scottish League One side Peterhead in January 2023.

References

External links

1996 births
Living people
Ghanaian footballers
Association football forwards
Ermis Aradippou FC players
Veikkausliiga players
Rovaniemen Palloseura players
Tercera División players
Lorca FC players
Ghana under-20 international footballers
Ghanaian expatriate footballers
Ghanaian expatriate sportspeople in Cyprus
Ghanaian expatriate sportspeople in Finland
Ghanaian expatriate sportspeople in Spain
Expatriate footballers in Cyprus
Expatriate footballers in Finland
Expatriate footballers in Spain
Ghanaian expatriate sportspeople in Scotland
Expatriate footballers in Scotland
Scottish Professional Football League players
Peterhead F.C. players
Mousehole A.F.C. players
Hendon F.C. players
Thatcham Town F.C. players
Isthmian League players
Expatriate footballers in England
FC Astoria Walldorf players
ENAD Polis Chrysochous players